Gunhild of Wessex (fl. 1066–1093) was a younger daughter of Harold Godwinson and his first wife, Edyth Swannesha, who was most likely the wealthy magnate Edyth the Fair from the Domesday Book.

Life 
Gunhild remained in England after her father's death at the Battle of Hastings in 1066 and received her education at Wilton Abbey. This was a centre of learning, which attracted many high-born women, both English and Norman. Matilda of Scotland was educated here, with her sister Mary. It was also the home of the poet Muriel.

According to the Vita Wulfstani, while still living at Wilton as an adult, Gunhild began to go blind. St Wulfstan heard about her while visiting and made the sign of the cross before her eyes, at which she was healed.

She once met Anselm of Canterbury and afterwards wrote to him that she intended to follow a religious life. However, in 1093 she eloped with Alan the Red, then in his middle 50s. According to Danelaw, Gunhild was the heiress of her mother's claims to some counties, properties which had been acquired by Alan the Red, and it may be for this reason that she attracted Alan's attention. Other possibilities include political reasons, or love: Anselm, in a letter addressed to her at this time, stated that she and Alan the Red loved each other.

In his letter to her, Anselm argued that although she had not been consecrated as a nun, she had stated her intention to lead a religious life and so should now return "the nun's habit". She apparently replied that she had stated this intention because she had been promised an abbacy, and that this promise not being fulfilled, she was under no obligation to return.

The historian Richard Sharpe has argued that Alan the Red and Gunhild had a daughter named Matilda, who was the wife of Walter D'Aincourt.

After Alan the Red's death shortly after the elopement in 1093, Gunhild settled with his brother Alan the Black, who was heir to his brother's vast estates. Anselm wrote to her again to refute her previous arguments and urge her again to return to Wilton.

Some say she married Alan the Black, and she may have predeceased him.

References

Anglo-Norse women
Anglo-Saxon women
House of Godwin
11th-century English people
11th-century English women
English princesses
Daughters of kings